John Theodore Saxe (April 22, 1843 - June 30, 1881) was the senior member of the Saxe Brothers firm, and a professor at the Albany Academy.

Biography
He was born on April 22, 1843 in St. Albans, Vermont to John Godfrey Saxe and Sophia Newell Sollace. He graduated from the University of Vermont in 1862, A.B., 1865, A.M. He was the senior member of the lumber merchant firm, Saxe Brothers. He was a professor in the Albany Academy, 1862-1863. He married Mary Bosworth in New York City, on January 18, 1876. She died at Albany, April 27, 1881. Her parents were Chief Justice Joseph Sollace Bosworth, of the superior court of New York, and Frances Pumpelly. They had one son, John Godfrey Saxe II. He died at Albany, New York on June 30, 1881.

References

1843 births
1881 deaths
People from St. Albans, Vermont
University of Vermont alumni
19th-century American businesspeople